Joseph Graham Sugg (born 8 September 1991) is an English YouTuber and actor. In 2012, he began posting videos on the YouTube channel ThatcherJoe, currently at over 7 million subscribers. In 2018, he was a finalist on the sixteenth series of Strictly Come Dancing, and in 2019, he portrayed Ogie Anhorn in the West End production of Waitress. He is the younger brother of fellow YouTuber Zoe Sugg.

Early life and ancestry 
Sugg was born in Lacock, Wiltshire, and attended The Corsham School in Corsham, Wiltshire, where he gained two A*s, an A and a B in his A-levels. The name of his YouTube 'ThatcherJoe' channel is derived from his apprenticeship as a roof thatcher. He is the younger brother of Zoe Sugg, who is also a blogger and internet personality, known on YouTube as Zoella.

In a November 2021 episode of Who Do You Think You Are?, Sugg discovered that his ancestors from Jersey were working in electrical telegraphy in the early years of its development and implementation. He also found that his 7× great-grandparents were Huguenot refugees from Frênes in Normandy who fled religious persecution in France and made their way to Jersey in the mid-eighteenth century.

Career

YouTube
Sugg created his 'ThatcherJoe' channel in November 2011 and reached the one-million-subscriber mark two years later. His channel became known for its pranks, impressions and challenge videos, such as the Whisper challenge, which became a popular YouTube trend after Sugg created a YouTuber version of the challenge in 2014. In January 2013, Sugg began his vlogging channel, 'ThatcherJoeVlogs', and in June 2014, he created his gaming channel, 'ThatcherJoeGames'. 

In September 2020, Sugg announced that he would be the voice of the robot R-41 in Daleks!, an animated Doctor Who series which was released on YouTube in November 2020 as part of Time Lord Victorious.

In May 2022, it was revealed that Sugg had voiced the host of an animated chat show aimed at children and families called Corpse Talk, based on a series of graphic novels and comics about various historical figures, which is available on YouTube.

Film and television
Sugg had an uncredited voiceover role as a seagull in the 2015 UK version of the film The SpongeBob Movie: Sponge Out of Water. Also in 2015, Sugg appeared alongside Caspar Lee in the direct-to-DVD film Joe and Caspar Hit the Road, which was shown on British television channel E4 in April 2016. A second DVD, Joe & Caspar Hit the Road USA, was released in 2016. Alongside fellow YouTubers Alfie Deyes and Marcus Butler, Sugg starred in an episode of the British television show Release the Hounds, which aired in March 2017. 

In 2018, Sugg became the first 'social media star' to appear on Strictly Come Dancing, and he was partnered with professional dancer Dianne Buswell. The pair reached the final and finished as runners-up. Shortly after the final, the BBC announced Sugg as co-presenter of New Year Live, alongside Stacey Dooley. On 22 February 2019, Sugg co-hosted The One Show on BBC One, with Alex Jones, and he was one of the hosts for the Red Nose Day telethon on the BBC on 15 March 2019. 

Sugg voiced Gus in the UK version of the film Wonder Park (2019). In May 2019, he guest starred on the Cartoon Network show, The Amazing World of Gumball, as the voice of Azreal. In July 2019, Sugg announced that he would have a cameo voiceover role in the 2019 Aardman film A Shaun the Sheep Movie: Farmageddon.  

In January 2020, Sugg was a guest panellist on the BBC One show Would I Lie to You. In March 2020, he appeared as a contestant on The Great Stand Up to Cancer Bake Off, in which he fainted due to a flesh wound, but recovered to take the title of Star Baker. 

It was announced in August 2020 that Sugg would make his television acting debut in the fourth season of the BBC One drama The Syndicate. In May 2021, it was confirmed that Sugg had joined the cast of the animated adaptation of The Amazing Maurice, which was released in December 2022.

Music and stage 
Sugg was a member of the YouTube Boyband, which raised money for Comic Relief and became a viral hit. He also featured on the 2014 single "Do They Know It's Christmas?" as part of the Band Aid 30 charity supergroup, raising money for the Ebola virus epidemic in West Africa. In January 2020, Sugg released his debut single, "Say It Now". In August 2021, he released his second single, "Wild Things". 

In August 2019, Sugg was cast as Ogie Anhorn in the musical Waitress in London's West End. He debuted in the role on 9 September 2019, and gave his final performance on 30 November 2019.

Graphic novels and book
Sugg is the author of the graphic novel Username: Evie, published in 2015 by Hodder & Stoughton. The writing is by Matt Whyman, with illustrations by Amrit Birdi. The story is about bullied teenage schoolgirl Evie, who dreams of a place she can be herself. Her terminally ill father creates a virtual reality for her, but dies before it is completed. After he leaves her an app that allows entry, Evie is transported into a world where everything is influenced by her personality. Username: Evie became the fastest-selling graphic novel in the UK since records began, selling 13,745 copies in its debut week. A sequel, Username: Regenerated, was published in 2016, and the third and final graphic novel in the series, Username: Uprising, was released in 2017.

In March 2022, Sugg announced that he had written a book called Grow, a part memoir, part practical guide about reconnecting with nature in the digital age, which was published in September 2022.

Strictly Come Dancing
From September 2018, Sugg participated in the sixteenth series of Strictly Come Dancing, partnered with Australian dancer Dianne Buswell. They reached the final, finishing as runners-up.

Notes
 Alfonso Ribeiro filled in for Tonioli

Strictly Come Dancing: The Live Tour! 2019 
Sugg, along with his professional dance partner Dianne Buswell, appeared in the Strictly Come Dancing Live! tour during January and February 2019. The pair made Strictly Live Tour history by winning 25 shows in a row against six other couples, later becoming the overall tour winners having won 28 of the 29 shows.

Strictly Come Dancing: The Official Podcast
In August 2019, it was announced that Sugg would be taking over as co-host of the show's official podcast.

2019 Christmas special
On 5 November 2019, it was announced that Sugg would be participating in the 2019 Christmas special episode. A week later it was revealed that he would be dancing with Dianne Buswell, as he did in series 16 of the show.

Personal life 
Sugg has been in a relationship with Dianne Buswell, his dance partner from Strictly Come Dancing, since late 2018. The couple confirmed that they were living together in August 2019. In February 2021, they revealed that they had bought a house together.

In 2018, Sugg and Caspar Lee established a management company, Margravine, to support up-and-coming digital talent.

In August 2022, it was announced that Sugg's production company Final Straw Productions had partnered with BBC Studios to develop entertainment and factual entertainment formats for audiences of all ages. 

Sugg is a keen artist, and often shares his artwork on his social media channels. 

He is an ambassador for the charity Age UK.

Filmography

Film

Television

Stage

Podcast

Awards and nominations

References

1991 births
Living people
British Internet celebrities
Comic Relief people
English male actors
English video bloggers
English YouTubers
Male bloggers
People from Wiltshire